Glen Innes is a suburb in East Auckland, New Zealand, located nine kilometres to the east of the city centre, close to the waters of the Tamaki River estuary.

Glen Innes gets its name from a large farm owned by William Innes Taylor that was here. There were four Taylor brothers in Auckland, the sons of a British man who had had a military career in India. Three of the brothers had farms in this area and built houses;  William Innes Taylor at Glen Innes, Richard James Taylor at Glendowie and Charles John Taylor at Glen Orchard (now Saint Heliers). Their brother Allan Kerr Taylor had a farm estate in Mount Albert, whose house was called Alberton.

The main streets in Glen Innes are Taniwha Street and Apirana Avenue, which meet in the shopping centre of the suburb.  Glen Innes has a train station on the Eastern Line of the Auckland rail network, and is a hub for eastern Auckland isthmus buses (Metrolink).

Glen Innes has for the most part been a low-income, working class area with around 1,500 state houses. In an effort to improve the quality of state housing in Glen Innes, the Government introduced "Talbot Park", an area of higher density housing, consisting of mostly apartment-style places.

European settlement 
The first government sale of land in Tamaki was on 1 February 1842.  Allotments were bought for farming by Charles Whybrow Lidgar. John Armitage Buttery and Patrick Anderson.  William Innes Taylor arrived in Auckland in November 1843 and shortly after, he made his first purchase of land.  Taylor named the farm the Glen Innes estate.  He  gradually added to his land holdings and by 1862, Taylor owned around  751 acres. The site Taylor chose for his homestead was that which is now occupied by the Glen Taylor School on West Tamaki Road.  Although the homestead is no longer in existence, a Morton Bay fig tree, thought to have been planted by Taylor still stands at the entrance of the school.   William Innes Taylor died on 7 March 1890. By 1913, 400 acres of the Glen Innes estate was subdivided and sold.  The land was described as peerless seaside sections.

Demographics

Glen Innes West had a population of 4,413 at the 2018 New Zealand census, an increase of 810 people (22.5%) since the 2013 census, and an increase of 594 people (15.6%) since the 2006 census. There were 1,212 households, comprising 2,109 males and 2,304 females, giving a sex ratio of 0.92 males per female. The median age was 29.0 years (compared with 37.4 years nationally), with 1,125 people (25.5%) aged under 15 years, 1,149 (26.0%) aged 15 to 29, 1,824 (41.3%) aged 30 to 64, and 315 (7.1%) aged 65 or older.

Ethnicities were 39.1% European/Pākehā, 20.8% Māori, 40.2% Pacific peoples, 12.5% Asian, and 3.6% other ethnicities. People may identify with more than one ethnicity.

The percentage of people born overseas was 33.8, compared with 27.1% nationally.

Although some people chose not to answer the census's question about religious affiliation, 32.8% had no religion, 49.2% were Christian, 3.1% had Māori religious beliefs, 0.7% were Hindu, 3.5% were Muslim, 2.5% were Buddhist and 1.6% had other religions.

Of those at least 15 years old, 645 (19.6%) people had a bachelor's or higher degree, and 624 (19.0%) people had no formal qualifications. The median income was $25,200, compared with $31,800 nationally. 474 people (14.4%) earned over $70,000 compared to 17.2% nationally. The employment status of those at least 15 was that 1,494 (45.4%) people were employed full-time, 486 (14.8%) were part-time, and 237 (7.2%) were unemployed.

Education

It teaches primarily in the Māori language.

All these schools are coeducational. Rolls are as of

Redevelopment conflict 

There have been protests in Glen Innes over proposals to redevelop existing state-owned housing. Housing New Zealand plans to replace houses on large sections with more "intensive development", including many conversions to privately owned and sold housing with profits going to developers such as property mogul, Murdoch Dryden. This involves removing tenants from properties some have lived in for long periods. There has been a number of reported deaths of elderly tenants from during the relocation process. Many protests have resulted in arrests of demonstrators, including Mana Party MP Hone Harawira on one occasion, as well as a number of reported police brutality cases. Housing New Zealand argues that the development will "make better use of land"  and enable the provision of higher quality homes to their tenants, however community members argue it is a gentrification process which is tearing apart their community.

Notable people

Dave Dobbyn
George Moala

Panmure-Glen Innes industrial area
The area to the southwest of Glen Innes is primarily industrial.

Panmure Glen Innes Industrial had a population of 321 at the 2018 New Zealand census, an increase of 69 people (27.4%) since the 2013 census, and an increase of 168 people (109.8%) since the 2006 census. There were 51 households, comprising 192 males and 129 females, giving a sex ratio of 1.49 males per female. The median age was 33.6 years (compared with 37.4 years nationally), with 24 people (7.5%) aged under 15 years, 108 (33.6%) aged 15 to 29, 165 (51.4%) aged 30 to 64, and 21 (6.5%) aged 65 or older.

Ethnicities were 35.5% European/Pākehā, 23.4% Māori, 21.5% Pacific peoples, 27.1% Asian, and 4.7% other ethnicities. People may identify with more than one ethnicity.

The percentage of people born overseas was 44.9, compared with 27.1% nationally.

Although some people chose not to answer the census's question about religious affiliation, 31.8% had no religion, 43.9% were Christian, 4.7% had Māori religious beliefs, 6.5% were Hindu, 4.7% were Muslim, 1.9% were Buddhist and 3.7% had other religions.

Of those at least 15 years old, 57 (19.2%) people had a bachelor's or higher degree, and 33 (11.1%) people had no formal qualifications. The median income was $26,700, compared with $31,800 nationally. 30 people (10.1%) earned over $70,000 compared to 17.2% nationally. The employment status of those at least 15 was that 153 (51.5%) people were employed full-time, 42 (14.1%) were part-time, and 21 (7.1%) were unemployed.

References 

 Delving Into The Past Of Auckland's Eastern Suburbs; section 6, St Heliers Bay. Elizabeth T. Jackson. Premier Print Services 1976.

External links
Photographs of Glen Innes held in Auckland Libraries' heritage collections.

Suburbs of Auckland
Ōrākei Local Board Area